Broadcasting Transmitting Centre in Rusinowo, is a 320 metres tall guyed steel mast, the highest structure of the West Pomeranian Voivodeship. In years 60 of the ones and 70 of the ones stood right next to the current mast second, earlier put, mast about 270 metres high, as a result of incorrect making of sure join the structure the mast was dismantled because was in danger of collapsing. On the RTCN area Rusinowo are visible in grass old already unused concrete blocks from rust with anchors.

Transmitted programmes

FM radio

Digital television MPEG-4

See also
 List of masts

External links
 http://emi.emitel.pl/EMITEL/obiekty.aspx?obiekt=DODR_W1C
 http://radiopolska.pl/wykaz/pokaz_lokalizacja.php?pid=124
 http://www.przelaczenie.eu/mapy/zachodniopomorskie
 http://www.dvbtmap.eu/mapcoverage.html?chid=8761

Radio masts and towers in Poland
Wałcz County